Seymour Galapagos Ecological Airport (Spanish: Aeropuerto Ecológico Galápagos Seymour)  is an airport serving the island of Baltra, one of the Galápagos Islands in Ecuador.

Facilities 
The airport became the world's first "green" airport in December 2012.

The new terminal, which consists of recycled steel tubes taken from oil drilling operations in the Amazon, is spread over 6,000 square meters and required an investment of just over $24 million. The new complex will use clean, renewable technologies such as solar energy, wind farms, and seawater desalination, among other environmental innovations.

According to ECOGAL, the company that operates the terminal, and the construction of the new airport took into account the surrounding environment and sought to make a minimal impact on the ecosystem. The project was announced in 2008, with construction commencing in 2012. The purpose of the redevelopment from the outset was to create the world's first ecological airport. ECOGAL was awarded a 15-year concession to administer and operate the airport.

The Galapagos VOR-DME (Ident: GLV) is located on the field.

History 
During World War II, the airport (known as  Seymour Island Airfield) was used by the United States Army Air Forces Sixth Air Force defending the South American coastline and the Panama Canal against Japanese submarines. The first American personnel arrived on 9 April 1942.  Military flying units assigned to the airport were:

 52d Fighter Squadron (32d Fighter Group), 5 June-1 December 1942 (P-40 Warhawk)
 51st Fighter Squadron (32d Fighter Group, later XXVI Fighter Command) 9 December 1942 – 4 March 1944 (P-40 Warhawk)
 Detachments stationed at Salinas Afld, Ecuador, and Talara Afld, Peru, December 1942-March 1943
 3d Bombardment Squadron (6th Bombardment Group) 4 May 1942 – 12 March 1943 (LB-30 (B-24A) Liberator)
 29th Bombardment Squadron (6th Bombardment Group) 13 May 1943 – 10 April 1944; 26 April–October 1945 (B-24 Liberator)
 45th Bombardment Squadron (40th Bombardment Group) 18 February-22 May 1943 (LB-30 (B-24A) Liberator)
 74th Bombardment Squadron (VI Bomber Command) 21 August 1944 – 13 February 1945 (B-24 Liberator)
 397th Bombardment Squadron (VI Bomber Command) 7 April 1944 – 6 February 1945 (B-24 Liberator)

By 30 September 1945, most personnel were withdrawn and only a housekeeping staff remained.  The military facility was deactivated on 30 April 1946, leaving a communications unit which deactivated on 29 February 1948.   Today many of the former USAAF aircraft parking hardstands still exist, along with an unused NW/SE runway that was abandoned after the war but remains in reasonable condition.

Airlines and destinations

Statistics

See also
Transport in Ecuador
List of airports in Ecuador

References

External links

OpenStreetMap - Seymour
OurAirports - Seymour
SkyVector - Baltra
FallingRain - Seymour Airport

Airports in Ecuador
Airfields of the United States Army Air Forces
Buildings and structures in Galápagos Province